Tarang Television, commonly known as Tarang TV is an Odia-language based general entertainment television channel. Based in Bhubaneswar, India, it is owned by Odisha Television Ltd. Tarang is a digitally encrypted 24x7 Odia entertainment channel. It gives viewers family entertainment ranging from family shows to period drama and reality shows. The channel is aimed at entertaining Odias across the globe who enjoy content from their own land. Tarang TV's programming is targeted towards family audiences.

Current programming

Fiction

Soap operas

Dubbed shows

Non-fiction

Reality show

Former programming

Reality shows

Non-fiction

See also
List of Odia-language television channels
List of longest-running Indian television series
List of television stations in India
List of South Asian television channels by country

References

External links
 
YouTube channel of Tarang TV

Odisha Television Network
Television stations in Bhubaneswar
Odia-language television channels
Companies based in Bhubaneswar
Television channels and stations established in 2008
2008 establishments in Orissa